Cryptamorpha is a widespread genus of beetles in the family Silvanidae, which has not been comprehensively revised taxonomically. The best known species is Cryptamorpha desjardinsi. The most recently described species is Cryptamorpha triregia, from the Three Kings Islands, New Zealand.

References

Silvanidae genera